Thomas M. Morgan was a football manager, noted in the 1930s for twice being the manager of Port Vale, which is the area where he was born, as well having a spell as manager of Wrexham.

Playing career
Morgan played for Etruria Church, Goldenhill Villa, Tunstall Park and Goldenhill Warriors before joining Port Vale in the summer of 1910. He scored twice on his debut at inside-right in a 4–2 win at Audley in a Burslem Park Cup game. However he was forced into retirement due to injury the following year, having played just a further four games for the club.

Coaching career
Morgan was offered employment at Vale following his injury. He worked as a scout, assistant secretary and reserve team manager before being appointed the first time manager following the death of Joe Schofield in October 1929. He led the club to the Third Division North title at the end of the 1929–30 season despite having to sell star player Jack Mandley to Aston Villa; Vale had the best defensive record in the Football League with only 37 goals conceded. The following season, 1930–31, would see Vale post their best ever club finish of fifth in the Second Division. However he was sacked in June 1932 after they dropped to 20th-place by the end of the 1931–32 campaign. He once more became assistant-secretary and then was later made secretary-manager again in December 1937. Vale finished 15th in the Third Division North at the end of the 1937–38 season and then 18th in 1938–39. Morgan then resigned his position and accepted the role of Wrexham manager in April 1939.

Career statistics
Source:

as a player

as a manager

Honours

as a manager
Port Vale
Football League Third Division North: 1929–30

References

Year of birth missing
Year of death missing
Association football forwards
English footballers
Port Vale F.C. players
English football managers
Port Vale F.C. managers
Wrexham A.F.C. managers
English Football League managers
Association football coaches
Association football scouts
Port Vale F.C. non-playing staff